Aerides maculosa is a species of orchid endemic to India. The epithet "maculosa" means "spotted," in reference to the colored spots on the tepals.

References

maculosa
Orchids of India
Plants described in 1845